Biyo Kulule, also known as Bio Culul is a hot spring located southeast of Bosaso in Puntland, Somalia. It is  drive away from the city. The settlement contains several areas, including palm tree farms and grassland. It is one of the tourist hubs in Somalia and prioritized tourism spot within Bosaso and its surroundings.

External links
 Biyo kulule, Bari Somalia
 Biyo kulule, Somalia

References

Populated places in Bari, Somalia
Bosaso
Tourism in Somalia